Sam Storey (born 9 August 1963 in Belfast, Northern Ireland) is a former professional boxer. Storey fought at Super Middleweight and won the British Super Middleweight Title in 1995.

Born in the hardest hit area of Belfast during the ‘Troubles’ Sam was introduced to boxing from an early age as his father was the Irish National Coach.

Sam lived through many turbulent years of violence and riots yet he did not use these traumatic beginnings as an excuse, the opposite in fact as it was through sport, and boxing in particular that Sam avoided being involved in the Sectarianism that gripped Belfast during these grim times.

Sam went on to win every amateur title in Ireland and represented his country in the European, Commonwealth and Olympic Games. After travelling the world as an amateur Sam turned professional at the age of 23 and went on to fight for the British, European and World titles against the likes of Chris Eubank and Steve Collins. This illustrious career culminated in the outright ownership of the Londsdale Belt, a feat only managed by 2 Irishmen before him.

Since retiring from the sport in 1997 Sam has worked for Sky Sports and wrote a popular boxing column for the Sunday People newspaper. Sam currently divides his time between Belfast and Spain.

References

External links
 

1963 births
Living people
Boxers from Belfast
Male boxers from Northern Ireland
Irish male boxers
Boxers at the 1984 Summer Olympics
Olympic boxers of Ireland
Super-middleweight boxers